David Levy (born 26 January 1963 in Haifa) is an Israeli former professional association footballer who was part of the 1988–89 championship squad at Maccabi Haifa.

Biography

Early life 
Levy joined the Maccabi Haifa youth system at age 9 as he lived very close to Kiryat Eliezer Stadium. Rising through the youth ranks, he was called up to the first team squad by then manager, Jonny Hardy.

References

External links
  Profile and short biography of David Levy on Maccabi Haifa's official website

1963 births
Living people
Israeli Jews
Israeli footballers
Maccabi Haifa F.C. players
Hapoel Haifa F.C. players
Liga Leumit players
Footballers from Haifa
Association football defenders